Price-cap regulation is a form of regulation. Designed in the 1980s by UK Treasury economist Stephen Littlechild, it has been applied to all privatized British network utilities. It is contrasted with both rate-of-return regulation, with utilities being permitted a set rate of return on capital, and with revenue-cap regulation, with total revenue being the regulated variable.

Price cap regulation adjusts the operator's prices according to the price cap index that reflects the overall rate of inflation in the economy, the ability of the operator to gain efficiencies relative to the average firm in the economy, and the inflation in the operator's input prices relative to the average firm in the economy. Revenue cap regulation attempts to do the same thing but for revenue, rather than prices.

Price cap regulation is sometimes called "CPI - X", (in the United Kingdom "RPI-X") after the basic formula employed to set price caps. This takes the rate of inflation, measured by the Consumer Price Index (UK Retail Prices Index, RPI) and subtracts expected efficiency savings X. In the water industry, the formula is "RPI - X + K", where K is based on capital investment requirements. The system is intended to provide incentives for efficiency savings, as any savings above the predicted rate X can be passed on to shareholders, at least until the price caps are next reviewed (usually every five years). A key part of the system is that the rate X is based not only a firm's past performance, but on the performance of other firms in the industry: X is intended to be a proxy for a competitive market, in industries which are natural monopolies.

Now consider how a utility operator might be different from the average firm in the economy. First, assume that the operator is just like the average firm, except that the operator's input prices change at a rate that is different from the rate of change for the average firm. If the operator's input prices increase faster than (conversely, slower than) the rate of inflation, then the operator's retail prices (revenue) will need to increase faster than (conversely, slower than) the rate of inflation for the operator to be able to have earnings that are at least as great as the operator's cost of capital.
Now assume that the operator is just like the average firm, except with respect to the operator's ability to improve efficiency. If the operator increases its productivity faster than (conversely, slower than) the average firm, then the operator's retail prices (revenue) will need to decrease (conversely, increase) relative to the rate of inflation.

Combining these two possible differences between the operator and the average firm in the economy, the operator's retail prices (revenue) should change at the rate of inflation, minus (conversely, plus) the extent to which its input prices inflate less than (conversely, greater than) the rate of inflation, and minus (conversely, plus) the extent to which the operator's productivity is expected to improve at a rate that is greater than (conversely, less than) the average firm in the economy.

The above analysis identifies two things. First, the inflation rate, I, used in the price cap index represents the general rate of inflation for the economy. Second, the X-factor is intended to capture the difference between the operator and the average firm in the economy with respect to inflation in input prices and changes in productivity. That is to say, the choice of inflation index and of the X-factor go hand in hand. Some regulators choose a general measure of inflation, such as a gross national product price index. In this case, the X-factor reflects the difference between the operator and the average firm in the economy with respect to the operator's ability to improve its productivity and the effect of inflation on the operator's input costs. Other regulators choose a retail (or producer) price index. In these cases, the X-factor represents the difference between the operator and the average retail (or wholesale) firm. Lastly, some regulators construct price indices of operator inputs. In these cases, the X-factor reflects productivity changes of the operator.

In most industries in the UK, estimation of a firm's efficiency is carried out by comparing regional monopolies and using a total factor productivity method. However, for telecommunications, Ofcom instead relies on international comparisons.

In practice, the distinction between price-cap and rate-of-return regulation may be lost, as regulators may end up making implicit decisions on the acceptable real rates of return on capital employed in order to arrive at price limit determinations. This has been the experience in the UK water sector, where the 1999 periodic review led Ofwat to determine a standard (real post-tax) cost of capital of 4.75%, with minor adjustments for smaller companies. This standard rate was then used to help calculate X.  In addition, detailed aspects of the price elements incorporated into the price index may be more important to the actual operation of a price cap regulatory regime than either the X-factor or the inflation adjustment.  How rate elements are incorporated and removed from price caps is particularly important in industries with rapidly changing service offerings.

Price-cap regulation is no longer a uniquely British form of regulation. Particularly in the telecommunications industry, many Asian countries are implementing some form of price cap on their newly privatised operators. In addition, many US local exchange carriers are now regulated by price-cap rather than rate-of-return regulation: in 2003, of the 73 companies reporting to the ARMIS database, 22 were regulated according to an RPI-X price cap (and a further 35 were subject to other retail price controls). In Australia, the preferred form of price regulation for utilities is the CPI-X regime.

Notably, in 2018, the UK Government introduced a form of price cap regulation through a new 
cap for gas and electricity
customers on standard variable tariffs.

In August 2022, the energy price cap was raised to £3,549 which would push 8.2 million people in to fuel poverty in October that year.

See also
 Civil Aviation Authority (United Kingdom)
 Ofcom
 Ofgem
 Office of Rail and Road
 Ofwat
 Economic regulation
 Regulatory agency

References

External links
 Features of Price Cap and Revenue Cap Regulation from the Body of Knowledge on Infrastructure Regulation
 Data concerning U.S. interstate telephone service price caps
 Ian Alexander and Timothy Irwin (1996), "Price Caps, Rate-of-Return Regulation, and the Cost of Capital" 

Market failure
Monopoly (economics)
Economics of regulation